Los Angeles, California contains one of the largest concentrations of Israeli Americans in the United States.

History

Palestinian Jews in Los Angeles
In 1930, Palestinian Jews in Los Angeles organized "Agudath Eretz Israel of Los Angeles", the first Palestinian-Jewish organization in the American Southwest. The organization including several Palestinian Sephardim. The Palestinian-born Orthodox Rabbi Solomon Michael Neches of Congregation Talmud Torah served as President and Abraham Fleishman as Vice President. Hailing from Jerusalem, Rabbi Neches was heavily involved in the American Zionist movement and supported the creation of a Jewish state in Palestine. A September 1930 article from the ⁨⁨B'nai B'rith Messenger announced a celebration of the founding of Agudath Eretz Israel of Los Angeles, noting that "All Palestinians of Los Angeles and vicinity" were invited and that the event hosted features of Palestinian life and talent from Eretz Yisrael, including Haluzim (pioneer) song and dance as well as the Palestinian guest speaker Rev. Cantor Naftali Herz Halevi.

Post-1948 history

Many Israeli Americans in Los Angeles are first, second, or third-generation Americans and are the descendants of early Israeli immigrants arriving in the 1950's; while others are more recent immigrants who began moving to Los Angeles in a wave of migration that began in the 1970's continued to this day. The Israeli American community of Los Angeles has risen to prominence in local business, government and culture. Los Angeles is home to the world's first Israeli Community Center (ICC), similar to a JCC, located in the San Fernando Valley.

Population
Los Angeles is home to the largest population in the Israeli diaspora, with more than 250,000 Israeli Americans live in the Los Angeles, according to the Israeli American Council. The Israeli community of Los Angeles are mainly residents of the San Fernando Valley and the Westside of Los Angeles. The communities of Encino and Tarzana in particular are noted for their large Israeli populations.

Notable people
 Ari Emanuel
 Gal Gadot
 Omri Katz
 Hila Klein
 Haim Saban
 Yael Shelbia
 Ari Melber

See also

 Jews in Los Angeles
 Israeli Americans
 Israelis

References

Israeli-American history
History of Los Angeles
Ethnic groups in Los Angeles
Los Angeles
Middle Eastern-American culture in Los Angeles